Hsieh Su-wei and Elise Mertens defeated Veronika Kudermetova and Elena Rybakina in the final, 7–6(7–1), 6–3, to win the women's doubles tennis title at the 2021 Indian Wells Masters. It was Hsieh's third title at the tournament and her 30th career doubles title overall. Mertens successfully defended her title to win for a second time after she first won the tournament in 2019 with Aryna Sabalenka, who chose not to defend her title.

Mertens and Barbora Krejčíková were in contention for the world No. 1 doubles ranking at the beginning of the tournament. By winning the title, Mertens usurped Krejčíková for the top ranking.

Seeds

Draw

Finals

Top half

Bottom half

References

External links
 Main Draw

BNP Paribas Open - Doubles
Doubles women